The Republic of the Congo competed in the 2003 All-Africa Games held at the National Stadium in the city of Abuja, Nigeria. This was the eighth time that the country had competed in the Games since the Congo itself hosted the first in 1965. The country sent a substantial team which won six medals and came joint twenty-third in the medal table. Tatiana Bvegadz won a silver medal in judo. The team also received five bronze medals, including both individual and team accolades in karate.

Competitors
The Republic of the Congo entered 34 events, evenly distributed amongst the competitions for men and women. Competitors included Michelle Banga Mondzoula and Roger Angouono Moke who competed in the Women's 100 and 200 metres and Men's 100 and 200 metres respectively. Olympians Devilert Arsene Kimbembe and David Nkoua joined Moke in the 100 metre relay. In the team games, the women’s handball team qualified and reached fourth place.

Medal summary
Republic of the Congo won six medals, a silver and five bronze medals, and was ranked joint twenty third in the final medal table alongside Mali and Zambia.

Medal table

List of Medalists

Silver Medal

Bronze Medal

References

2003 in the Republic of the Congo sport
Nations at the 2003 All-Africa Games
2003